The Secretary for Public Works, later the Minister for Public Works was a long standing ministry in the administration of New South Wales created in 1859 and abolished in 2003.

Role and responsibilities
The Secretary for Lands and Works was one of the first ministries in the colonial administration of New South Wales and the land issue dominated the politics of the late 1850s. In October 1859, towards the end of the second Cowper ministry, the ministry was split into two ministries, the Secretary for Lands and the Secretary for Public Works, which enabled John Robertson to concentrate on what became known as the Robertson Land Acts, William Forster put forward and alternate explanation, that Cowper had created the position and appointed Flood in an unsuccessful attempt to strengthen his parliamentary position. The department had two main functions:

 The administration of the construction and maintenance of public works, including water supply, sewerage, electricity supply, railways, tramways, roads and electric telegraph; harbours and river navigation, the Civil Engineer (Dry Docks, Cockatoo Island), defence works and the Colonial Architect and
A Board which oversaw how tenders for public works were administered.

In 1906 the Secretary assumed responsibility for local government.

List of Secretaries and Ministers for Public Works

Former ministerial titles

References

Public Works